Rendel 2: Cycle of Revenge is an upcoming Finnish superhero film directed by Jesse Haaja. The film is a sequel to Rendel. The film stars Kris Gummerus, as the title character, Sean Cronin and Bruce Payne.

The premiere of the film was tentatively scheduled for early 2021.

Premise
The masked vigilante, Rendel, seeks revenge, when Smiley takes over the Vala drug corporation.

Cast

 Kristofer Gummerus as Rendel/Ramo
 Sean Cronin as Smiley/ Christopher Cox
 Bruce Payne as Edward Cox
 Minna Nevanoja as Nina
 Tero Salenius as Kurikka
 Kaitlyn Boyé as Fugu
 Mikko Nousiainen as Husky
 Juha-Matti Halonen as Skinny
 Jonah Paull as Kid 
 Jari Manninen as Gert
 Jarmo Mäkinen as Horst

Production
On May 27, 2018, at the Cannes Film Festival, Jesse Haaja announced that he would be making a sequel to Rendel called Rendel: Cycle of Revenge. While the film did not perform well in its native Finland, it did well internationally and Haaja, along with Black Lion and Canada-based Raven Banner Entertainment, would be working on the sequel.

On August 16, 2019, Haaja announced shooting would begin in September. Due to its international following, it was announced the film would be shot entirely in English and the cast would include original stars Kris Gummerus as Rendel, Tero Selinius as Kurrikka, and Minna Nevanoja as Niina Heikkinen along with Sean Cronin as the film's central villain Smiley; Kaitlyn Boyé as Fugu, Bruce Payne as Edward Cox, and Jonah Paull. Jessica Wolff is replacing Alina Tomnikov as Marla in the sequel.

The main shooting of the film was completed in Kainuu in six weeks. The film was shot both in Kajaani and in Jyväskylä.

References

External links
 

Upcoming films
Finnish action films
Films shot in Finland
Films set in Finland
Upcoming English-language films
Upcoming sequel films
Finnish science fiction films